Obreda  is a settlement in the administrative district of Gmina Książ Wielkopolski, within Śrem County, Greater Poland Voivodeship, in west-central Poland.

The settlement has a population of 7.

References

Obreda